"All the Way" is a song recorded by the British singer Craig David. It was written by David and Mark Hill his third studio album The Story Goes... (2005), while production was helmed by Hill. It was released on 8 August 2005 as the album's lead single, his first single he released with new label Warner Bros. Records after Wildstar Records went bankrupt. After missing the top ten with previous singles "World Filled with Love" and "You Don't Miss Your Water ('Til the Well Runs Dry)", "All the Way" returned David to the top three. It was the highest-charting single from The Story Goes... but not the biggest-selling as "Don't Love You No More (I'm Sorry)" spent over double the number of weeks inside the UK top 75.

Chart performance
"All the Way" charted at number three on the UK Singles Chart, returning David to the top forty. "All the Way" spent six weeks inside the UK top 75.

Music video
The music video became the sixth Craig David video directed by Max & Dania.

Track listing

Notes
  signifies an additional producer

Charts

Weekly charts

Year-end charts

Release history

References

2005 singles
2005 songs
Craig David songs
Music videos directed by Max & Dania
Songs written by Craig David
Songs written by Mark Hill (musician)